Topaz Ranch Estates is a census-designated place (CDP) in Douglas County, Nevada, United States. The population was 1,501 at the 2010 census.

Geography
Topaz Ranch Estates is located in southern Douglas County, along Nevada State Route 208.

Demographics

References

Census-designated places in Douglas County, Nevada
Census-designated places in Nevada